Pat Boone Sings Guess Who? is a studio album by Pat Boone, released in 1963 on Dot Records.

On this album, Boone covers Elvis Presley.

Track listing

References 

1963 albums
Pat Boone albums
Dot Records albums